The Nuclebrás Equipamentos Pesados S.A. known as NUCLEP, is a Brazilian state-owned nuclear company specialized in nuclear engineering and heavy equipment for nuclear, defense, oil and gas industries, founded on 12 April 1975.

See also
 Goiânia accident (Nuclebrás aided in response effort)
 National Nuclear Energy Commission

References

Manufacturing companies of Brazil
Companies based in Rio de Janeiro (state)
Manufacturing companies established in 1975
Engineering companies of Brazil
Defence companies of Brazil
Nuclear technology companies of Brazil
Brazilian companies established in 1975